David Graham Dawson (born 7 March 1982) is an Australian former cricketer who played for Tasmania and New South Wales. He plays club cricket for Kingborough Cricket Club.

Dawson broke into the Australian first class cricket scene in spectacular fashion when on debut he became the first batsman to ever score a century on debut and carry the bat through the innings at the same time.

External links

1982 births
Living people
Australian cricketers
Tasmania cricketers
Cricketers from the Australian Capital Territory
Sportspeople from Canberra
New South Wales cricketers